The Queshi Bridge, in Shantou, China, is among the world's longest bridges. Its long span of  ranks it among the largest cable-stayed bridges in the world.

See also

 Shantou Bay Bridge
 List of largest cable-stayed bridges

References

Cable-stayed bridges in China
Bridges in Guangdong
Bridges completed in 1999
Transport in Shantou
1999 establishments in China